The Središte Monastery is a Serb Orthodox monastery located in the Banat region, in the northern Serbian province of Vojvodina. The monastery is situated near the villages of Malo Središte and Veliko Središte, in the Vršac municipality. It was built in the late 15th century by Despot Jovan Brankovic.

See also
List of Serb Orthodox monasteries

External links 

Monasteries in Banat

15th-century Serbian Orthodox church buildings
Christian monasteries established in the 15th century
Serbian Orthodox monasteries in Serbia
Serbian Orthodox monasteries in Vojvodina
Banat
Vršac